Ernst Siehr (5 October 1869, Heinrichswalde, East Prussia – 14 November 1945, Bergen auf Rügen) was a German lawyer and politician. He served in the imperial Reichstag from 1912 to 1918 as a member of the Progressive People's Party. He represented the newly founded German Democratic Party in the Weimar National Assembly and briefly in the subsequently elected republican Reichstag. He then served as Oberpräsident of East Prussia from 1920 to 1932.

1869 births
1945 deaths
People from Slavsky District
People from the Province of Prussia
German Protestants
Progressive People's Party (Germany) politicians
German Democratic Party politicians
Members of the Reichstag of the German Empire
Members of the Weimar National Assembly
Members of the Reichstag of the Weimar Republic
German Peace Society members
Lutheran pacifists
19th-century German lawyers
20th-century German lawyers